William Cordeiro Melo (born 15 July 1993), known as William Cordeiro, is a Brazilian footballer who plays for FK Partizani Tirana.

Club career
Born in Itabuna, Bahia, William Cordeiro made his senior debuts with Marcílio Dias in 2011. In November of the following year he signed for Juventus de Jaraguá, after nearly joining Avaí in July.

On 24 April 2013 William joined Figueirense. He made his first team debut for the club on 25 May, starting in a 3–2 home win against América-RN for the Série B championship.

On 6 March 2014 William was loaned to Atlético Hermann Aichinger, but returned to Figueira after only one match due to an injury.

On 10 September 2014 William made his Série A debut, playing the full 90 minutes in a 1–1 home draw against Fluminense. Ahead of the 2015 campaign, he renewed his link with the club.

Career statistics

Honours
Campeonato Catarinense: 2014

References

External links
William Cordeiro at playmakerstats.com (English version of ogol.com.br)

1993 births
Living people
Sportspeople from Bahia
Brazilian footballers
Brazilian expatriate footballers
Association football defenders
Association football midfielders
Campeonato Brasileiro Série A players
Campeonato Brasileiro Série B players
Kategoria Superiore players
Clube Náutico Marcílio Dias players
Grêmio Esportivo Juventus players
Figueirense FC players
Clube Atlético Hermann Aichinger players
Clube de Regatas Brasil players
Barretos Esporte Clube players
Associação Ferroviária de Esportes players
Oeste Futebol Clube players
FK Kukësi players
FK Partizani Tirana players
Brazilian expatriate sportspeople in Albania
Expatriate footballers in Albania